John Scottus School comprises a  primary and secondary school in Dublin, Ireland.

History 
The schools are named after John Scottus Eriugena, the Platonist philosopher, theologian and poet of Early Medieval Ireland. The school ethos is influenced by Christian and Platonic philosophy. 
The schools were founded in 1986 to provide education in philosophical principles. It is a sister school of the St James Independent School in the United Kingdom and is under the patronage of the John Scottus Educational Trust. The first year that they accepted students, four children were enrolled.

Curriculum

Primary 
John Scottus primary school is a national mixed school. The school's curriculum teaches the standard primary curriculum with a focus on philosophy. All students practice meditation and learn Sanskrit, alongside traditional national curriculum subjects.

Secondary 
John Scottus secondary school is a private fee paying school co-educational school. The secondary school curriculum includes subjects such as Latin, Classics and Greek alongside the more traditional Leaving Certificate curriculum.
The school offers bursaries and scholarships to sixth class students going into secondary school that cover up to half the fees for the Junior Certificate cycle.

Facilities 

The primary school is located on Northumberland Road, Dublin 4. In addition there is a second larger primary school along with a secondary that operates at Old Conna House, Rathmichael, County Dublin. All schools are co-educational and cost roughly €5000-6000 per year in tuition which includes a warm vegetarian meal.

References 

Private schools in the Republic of Ireland